Robert Seggie "Bobby" Cairns (27 May 1929 – 26 June 1998) was a former Scottish footballer who played in the Football League for Stoke City.

Career
Cairns began playing football with Royal Albert, Third Lanark and Ayr United. He joined Stoke City along with fellow Ayr United teammate Joe Hutton in 1953. He became a creative wing half for the "Potters" and was more of a playmaker than a goalscorer. He made almost 200 League and Cup appearances for Stoke in eight seasons at the Victoria Ground before leaving for non-league Macclesfield Town in 1961.

Career statistics

References

External links
 

Scottish footballers
Ayr United F.C. players
Third Lanark A.C. players
Macclesfield Town F.C. players
Royal Albert F.C. players
Stoke City F.C. players
English Football League players
1929 births
1998 deaths
Association football wing halves
Scottish Football League players
Footballers from Glasgow